"A Girl I Used to Know" is a song written by Jack Clement and originally released as a single by George Jones on United Artists Records. It became a top five hit for Jones, peaking at number three. Jones recorded the song again with wife Tammy Wynette as "Someone I Used to Know" for their debut duet album We Go Together in 1970. The song was also a number nine hit for Porter Wagoner and Dolly Parton in 1969.

Discography

George Jones songs
1962 songs
1962 singles
Songs written by Jack Clement
United Artists Records singles
Song recordings produced by Pappy Daily